Čifluk may refer to:
Chiflik, the non-Turkish spelling of an Ottoman system of land management
Čifluk, Visoko, a village in the municipality of Visoko, Federation of Bosnia and Herzegovina, Bosnia and Herzegovina
Čifluk, Tešanj, a village in the municipality of Tešanj, Federation of Bosnia and Herzegovina, Bosnia and Herzegovina
Čifluk, Travnik, a village in the municipality of Travnik, Federation of Bosnia and Herzegovina, Bosnia and Herzegovina
, a village in the municipality of Šipovo, Republika Srpska, Bosnia and Herzegovina
Čifluk (Ilijaš), a village in the municipality of Ilijaš, Federation of Bosnia and Herzegovina, Bosnia and Herzegovina

See also
 Čitluk (disambiguation)
 Čiflik (disambiguation)